Learning Disability Quarterly is a quarterly peer-reviewed academic journal that covers the field of special education. The editors-in-chief are Diane P. Bryant and Brian Bryant (University of Texas at Austin). The journal was established in 1978 and is published by SAGE Publications on behalf of the Hammill Institute on Disabilities.

Abstracting and indexing 
The journal is abstracted and indexed in ERIC and the Social Sciences Citation Index. According to the Journal Citation Reports, its 2017 impact factor is 2.132, ranking it 5 out of 40 journals in the category "Education, Special" and 9 out of 69 journals in the category "Rehabilitation".

References

External links 
 
 Hammill Institute on Disabilities

SAGE Publishing academic journals
English-language journals
Special education journals
Quarterly journals
Publications established in 1978